Postum is a powdered roasted grain beverage popular as a coffee substitute. The caffeine-free beverage was created by Post Cereal Company founder C. W. Post in 1895 and marketed as a healthier alternative to coffee. Post was a student of John Harvey Kellogg, who believed that caffeine was unhealthy. Post Cereal Company eventually acquired General Foods, then merged to Kraft Foods Inc. in 1990. Eliza's Quest Foods now owns the trademark rights and secret recipe of Postum.

The "instant" drink mix version was developed in 1912, replacing the original brewed beverage. Postum is made from roasted wheat bran and molasses.

In addition to the original flavor, coffee-flavored and cocoa-flavored versions have been introduced.

History

Postum quickly became popular, making Post wealthy. The aggressive advertising, with the slogan "There's a Reason", warned against the alleged dangers of coffee and caffeine, and promoted the benefits of Postum. When imitations appeared, the company introduced a cheaper drink called Monk's Brew that was identical to Postum, but discontinued it after competitors left the market. Instant Postum appeared in 1911.

Although the Post Cereal Company explicitly stated in its advertising that Postum did not taste like coffee and was not a coffee substitute, the drink enjoyed an enormous rise in sales and popularity in the United States during World War II when coffee was rationed and people sought a replacement.

Postum was sometimes marketed by a cartoon ghost named Mister Coffee Nerves, who would appear in situations wherein people were shown in uncomfortable life situations (e.g., irritability, lack of sleep, lack of athletic prowess) due to their use of coffee and its negative effects. These cartoons always ended with the afflicted people switching to Postum and Mister Coffee Nerves fleeing until the next cartoon. The company sponsored the radio shows Lum and Abner, Beulah and The Aldrich Family, and the radio version of Father Knows Best.

Postum was popular with members of the Church of Jesus Christ of Latter-day Saints and part of Mormon culture for many years because Mormons abstain from coffee. It was also popular with those following religious dietary restrictions of Seventh-day Adventists.

The U.S. government used Postum as a code name for polonium, used in the Urchin-style nuclear weapon initiators.

Kraft discontinued production of Postum in 2007. In May 2012, Kraft sold the Postum trademark and trade secret to Eliza's Quest Food, with Postum sold through the Postum.com website. As of January 2013, Eliza's Quest Food succeeded in returning Postum to many grocery stores across the United States and Canada.

Gallery

See also
 Barleycup
 Caro (sold as Pero in the United States)
 Coffee substitute
 Inka
 List of barley-based drinks
 Ovaltine
 Roasted grain drink

References

Further reading

In popular culture 
In "The Pez Dispenser", episode 14 of season 3 of Seinfeld, George and Jerry briefly discuss how Postum is underrated as a drink.

External links 

 
 A biography of C.W. (Charles William) Post
 Vintage Postum radio advertisements

Products introduced in 1895
Drink brands
Coffee substitutes
Post Consumer Brands brands
Utah cuisine
Hot drinks